The bowsprit of a sailing vessel is a spar extending forward from the vessel's prow. The bowsprit is typically held down by a bobstay that counteracts the forces from the forestays. The word bowsprit is thought to originate from the Middle Low German word bōchsprēt – bōch meaning "bow" and sprēt meaning "pole".

It is sometimes used to hold up the figurehead.

References

References 

 

Sailboat components